Panorpa flexa is a species of common scorpionfly in the family Panorpidae. It is found in North America.

References

Further reading

 

Mecoptera
Insects described in 1935